Londonderry Township is one of the nineteen townships of Guernsey County, Ohio, United States. As of the 2010 census the population was 727.

Geography
Located in the northeastern corner of the county, it borders the following townships:
Freeport Township, Harrison County - north
Flushing Township, Belmont County - northeast
Kirkwood Township, Belmont County - southeast
Oxford Township - south
Madison Township - southwest
Washington Township - northwest

No municipalities are located in Londonderry Township.

Name and history
It is the only Londonderry Township statewide.

Government
The township is governed by a three-member board of trustees, who are elected in November of odd-numbered years to a four-year term beginning on the following January 1. Two are elected in the year after the presidential election and one is elected in the year before it. There is also an elected township fiscal officer, who serves a four-year term beginning on April 1 of the year after the election, which is held in November of the year before the presidential election. Vacancies in the fiscal officership or on the board of trustees are filled by the remaining trustees.

References

External links
County website

Townships in Guernsey County, Ohio
Townships in Ohio